Clare Street may refer to:

 Clare Street, Dublin
 Clare Street, Bristol, an extension of Corn Street
 Clare Street, Northampton, the location of Clare Street drill hall, Northampton